Aphrodisium or Aphrodision was a town in ancient Arcadia, in the district Maenalia. It was not far from Megalopolis, on the road to Megalopolis and Tegea.

Its site is near the modern Marmaria/Ag. Ioannis.

References

Populated places in ancient Arcadia
Former populated places in Greece